The Gold Star Memorial Bridge is a pair of steel truss bridges that carry both Interstate 95 and U.S. Route 1 across the Thames River between New London, Connecticut, US and Groton, Connecticut. Its 11 highway lanes accommodate an average daily traffic of 117,000 vehicles. The bridge is actually a set of twin bridges, but they are generally spoken of using the singular "bridge;" the local media and residents refer to it as "The Goldstar".

History

The current south span (northbound) of the bridge was completed in 1943 as a single span carrying traffic in both directions. As part of the new highway, the bridge's purpose was to remove automobiles from a previous bridge that carried U.S. Route 1 over the Thames River. In 1951, the bridge was designated as the Gold Star Memorial Bridge in honor of members of the Armed Forces from Groton, New London, and Waterford who lost their lives during  World War I, World War II, and the Korean War.

In 1958, the Route 1 bypass containing the Gold Star Bridge was connected to the Connecticut Turnpike by extending west to what is today the interchange of Interstates 95 and 395 in East Lyme. East of the bridge, a  bypass of Route 184 was completed to the Rhode Island border on December 12, 1964, officially making the bridge and both bypasses part of Interstate 95. The stretch of I-95 containing the bridge is known as the Jewish War Veterans Memorial Highway.

During construction of the north span (southbound) on July 1, 1972, the US Coast Guard Academy's three-masted barque  was involved in a serious accident with the bridge as she was returning to her berth in New London. The ship's foremast and mainmast caught the safety netting slung below the new bridge, despite extensive precautions, as she passed below the original span and the new span being built parallel to it. Both masts were snapped off about seven-eighths of the way up, the upper parts left hanging dangerously from the remaining upright masts. The ship had to undergo emergency repairs as a result.

The bridge's second span was completed in 1973.

Design
The design is a pair of steel truss bridges, each composed of eleven spans.

The newer southbound span has a sidewalk/bike path accessible from Bridge St and Riverview Ave on the Groton side and Williams Street on the New London side.

Gallery

Notes

External links

Road bridges in Connecticut
U.S. Route 1
Interstate 95
Bridges completed in 1943
Bridges completed in 1973
Bridges in New London County, Connecticut
Bridges on the Interstate Highway System
Bridges of the United States Numbered Highway System
Bridges over the Thames River (Connecticut)
Steel bridges in the United States
1943 establishments in Connecticut